The Italian Catholic diocese of Narni, in central Italy, was suppressed in 1907, becoming part of the diocese of Terni.

History
Narni is the ancient Nequinum of the Sabines, called Narnia by the Romans. Liutprand captured the town in 726, but Pope Zacharias persuaded him to restore it to the Duchy of Rome in 742, after which it remained under pontifical rule.

Narni venerates as its first bishop the martyr Juvenalis, who died in the second half of the fourth century; St. Maximus, who was bishop in 425, was succeeded by his two sons Hercules and Pancratius. Gregory the Great refers to the bishop St. Cassius, who died in 558; the same pontiff wrote a letter to the bishop Projectinus which shows that, at Narni, at that time, there were still pagans to be converted.

Bishop John (940) was succeeded by his son, who became Pope John XIII; among other bishops were: William, a Franciscan, whom Pope Urban V employed against the Fraticelli (1367); and Raimondo Castelli (1656), founder of the seminary.

From 1198 to 1214, Narni was in rebellion against Pope Innocent III, who temporarily suppressed its episcopal see. The churches of this city contain many paintings of the ancient Umbrian school.

Bishops
Saint Juvenal I (359 – 7 August 376)
Maximus ? (376 – 416)
Pancratius I ? (416 – 455)
Hercules ? (455 – 470)
Pancratius II (? – 5 October 493)
Vitalian ? (before May 495 ? – after 499)
Saint Proculus ? (536 – 536)
Saint Cassius (21 September or 19 October 536 – 30 June 558)
Saint Juvenal II ? (558 – 3 May 565)
John I (mentioned between September and December 558)
Praejectus (mentioned in 591)
Constantine I (before July 595 – after 598)
Saint Anastasius (before 649 – 17 August 653 ?)
Deusdedit (before 679 – after 680)
Vilarus (mentioned in 721)
Constantine II (mentioned in 741)
Ansuald (mentioned in 769)
Stephen I (mentioned in 853)
Martin I (before 861 – after 879)
Bonosus (before 898 – after 906)
John II (before 961 – 1 October 965, elected pope)
Stepheno II (before 968 – after 1015)
Dodo ? (before 1028 – after 1037)
Martin II ? (mentioned in 1050)
Adalbert (or Albert) (before 1059 – after 1065)
Rudolf (mentioned )
Augustine (before 1101 – after 1125)
anonymous (mentioned in 1146)
Peter I (before 1156 – 2 July 1161, named bishop of Split)
Amatus (mentioned in 1179)
Boniface (before September1180 – after 1196)
Ugolino ? (mentioned in 1208)
John III (28 May 1220 – ?)
Gregory (before September 1225 – after 1234)
Jacopo Mansueti ( – )
Orlando, O.E.S.A. (1261 – 1303)
Peter II, O.E.S.A. (December 1305 – after July 1322)
Amantius (or Amator) (4 November 1323 – 1336)
Linus (17 April 1336 – 1342)
Agostino Tinacci, O.E.S.A. (17 March 1343 – 1367)
Guglielmo, O.F.M. (12 April 1367 – 30 March 1373, named bishop of Urbino)
Luca Bertini, C.R.S.A. (30 March 1373 – 2 October 1377, named archbishop of Siena)
Giacomo Tolomei (11 January 1378 – 1383, named bishop of Chiusi)
Francesco Bellanti (before September1386 – 1407, named bishop of Grosseto)
Giacomo da Perugia, O.P. (1407 – 1408)
Angelo (7 August 1408 – 1412)
Donadio (17 September 1414 – 1418)
Giacomo Bonriposi (31 January 1418 – 1455)
Lelio (3 September 1455 – 1462 ?)
Constantin Eruli (10 Dec 1462 – 8 Jan 1472 Appointed, Bishop of Todi)
Carlo Boccardini (8 Jan 1472 – 1498 Died)
Pietro Guzman (4 Jul 1498 – 21 Apr 1515 Died)
Francesco Soderini (21 Apr 1515 – 18 May 1517 Resigned)
Ugolino Martelli (bishop) (18 May 1517 – 1523 Died)
Carlo Soderini (1523 – 1524 Died)
Paolo Emilio Cesi (20 May 1524 – 1 Jun 1524 Resigned)
Bartolomeo Cesi (bishop) (1 Jul 1524 – 1537 Died)
Guido Ascanio Sforza di Santa Fiora (5 Dec 1537 – 11 Jan 1538 Resigned)
Giovanni Rinaldi Montorio (11 Jan 1538 – 1546 Died)
Pierdonato Cesi (seniore) (25 Jun 1546 – 12 Jul 1566 Resigned)
Romolo Cesi (12 Jul 1566 – 13 Jun 1578 Resigned)
Erolo Eroli (13 Jun 1578 – 13 Oct 1600 Died)
Giovanni Battista Toschi (28 May 1601 – 31 Jul 1606 Appointed, Bishop of Tivoli)
Giovanni Battista Bonetti (31 Jul 1606 – Jul 1632 Died)
Lorenzo Azzolini (2 Aug 1632 – Nov 1633 Died)
Giovanni Paolo Buccerelli (22 Mar 1634 – 21 Feb 1656 Died)
Raimondo Castelli (26 Jun 1656 – 14 Jul 1670 Died)
Ottavio Avio (1 Sep 1670 – 9 Aug 1682 Died)
Giuseppe Felice Barlacci (24 May 1683 – 1 May 1690 Resigned)
Francesco Picarelli (22 May 1690 – Dec 1708 Died)
Francesco Saverio Guicciardi (15 Apr 1709 – 24 Jan 1718 Appointed, Bishop of Cesena)
Gioacchino Maria Oldi, O. Carm. (11 Feb 1718 – 27 Jan 1725 Resigned)
Nicola Terzago (29 Jan 1725 – 31 Aug 1761 Died)
Prospero Celestino Meloni (23 Nov 1761 – 1791 Died)
Antonio David (27 Jun 1796 – 14 Jun 1818 Died)
Antonio Maria Borghi (2 Oct 1818 – 8 Jun 1834 Died)
Gioacchino Tamburini (Tamberini) (30 Sep 1834 – 22 Jul 1842 Appointed, Bishop of Cervia)
Giuseppe Maria Galligari (22 Jul 1842 – 1858 Resigned)
Giacinto Luzi (23 Dec 1858 – 9 Jan 1876 Died)
Vitale Galli (9 Jan 1876 – 12 Jul 1888 Died)
Cesare Boccanera (11 Feb 1889 – Nov 1905 Resigned)
Francesco Moretti (11 Dec 1905 – 12 Apr 1907 Appointed, Bishop of Terni e Narni)
United 12 April 1907 with the Diocese of Terni to form the Diocese of Terni e Narni

Notes

External links
Source
Blessed Lucy of Narni
 Cathedral of St. Juvenal and Chapel of Bl. Lucy of Narni: In City Walks in Umbria by L. Rouse
Catholic Hierarchy page

Narni